Neomphalidae is a family of sea snails or limpets, specifically deep sea hydrothermal vent limpets. This family was included in the Vetigastropoda, which is a clade according to the Bouchet & Rocroi, 2005. It is now included in the clade Neomphalina.

No subfamilies are included in this family. The Neomphalidae was removed from the subclass Eogastropoda where it was the only family in the superfamily  Neomphaloidea McLean, 1981 and order  Neomphalida (McLean, 1981).

Genera
Genera and species within the Neomphalidae include:
 Cyathermia Warén & Bouchet, 1989
 Lacunoides Warén & Bouchet, 1989
 Neomphalus McLean, 1981 - type genus
 Planorbidella Warén & Bouchet, 1993
 Solutigyra Warén & Bouchet, 1989
 Symmetromphalus McLean, 1990

References

External links